Events from the year 1618 in Sweden

Incumbents
 Monarch – Gustaf II Adolf

Events

 - Foundation of the National Archives of Sweden.
 - Armistice between Sweden and Poland. 
 - Reorganization of the Legal, Financial and Administrative Services Agency.
 - The brothel of Sara Simonsdotter in Stockholm is exposed and leads to a scandal involving several prominent people. 
 - Stadslagen is reprinted and confirmed as the law of the cities until 1734.

Births

 - Olaus Verelius

Deaths

 - John, Duke of Östergötland, prince  (born 1589) 
 - Princess Maria Elizabeth of Sweden
 - Ebba Bielke

References

 
Years of the 17th century in Sweden
Sweden